Coaster Works, known in Japan as , is a simulation game for the Dreamcast console published by Bimboosoft. The game is a simulation of roller coaster design and construction. Each of the levels offer certain requirements that the player must meet to pass to the next level. The game starts the player off in a "kiddie" themed park and progresses to more and more difficult levels with more difficult requirements. A direct sequel titled  was released on November 2, 2000 in Japan only as the North American and PAL releases were cancelled for 2001.

Reception

The game received above-average reviews according to the review aggregation website Metacritic. IGN gave it favorable reviews, while GameSpot gave it mixed reviews, months before the game was released Stateside. Eric Bratcher of NextGen, however, said of the game, "The engine is fast (though graphically bland), but a trip to a real amusement park would cost about the same and last longer than four hours. Plus, you could buy corn dogs and funnel cake." In Japan, Famitsu gave it a score of 28 out of 40 for the first Jet Coaster Dream, 25 out of 40 for the sequel, and 27 out of 40 for the PlayStation 2 version.

References

External links
 
 

1999 video games
2000 video games
2003 video games
Bottom Up games
Dreamcast games
PlayStation 2 games
Roller coaster games and simulations
Video games developed in Japan
Xicat Interactive games
Single-player video games